Marzdaran District is a district (bakhsh) in Sarakhs County, Razavi Khorasan Province, Iran. At the 2006 census, its population was 16,120, in 3,618 families.  The District has one city: Mazdavand.  The District has three rural districts (dehestan): Golbibi Rural District, Marzdaran Rural District, and Pol Khatun Rural District.

References 

Districts of Razavi Khorasan Province
Sarakhs County